Yelm Creek is a stream in Thurston County in the U.S. state of Washington. It is a tributary to the Nisqually River.

A Nisqually Indian settlement once stood at its mouth.

References

Rivers of Thurston County, Washington
Rivers of Washington (state)